Major Richard Waldron (or Richard Waldern, Richard Walderne; 1615–1689) was an English-born merchant, soldier, and government official who rose to prominence in early colonial Dover, New Hampshire. His presence spread to greater New Hampshire and neighboring Massachusetts. He was the second president of the colonial New Hampshire Royal Council after it was first separated from Massachusetts.

Described as an "immensely able, forceful and ambitious" member of a well-off Puritan family, he left his English home and moved to what is now Dover, New Hampshire.  He first came about 1635.  He built mills on the Cochecho River, amassed local land holdings that endured in his family for over 170 years, controlled much of the local native trade, and was prominent in local politics and as deputy to the Massachusetts General Court for twenty five years from 1654. He was speaker several times.  When the first president of the colonial New Hampshire council, John Cutt, died suddenly, council member Walderne became the acting president or governor until Edward Cranfield arrived from England. "By the 1670s the portion of Dover known as Cochecho [village] had become something like Waldron's personal fiefdom, and citizens in the other areas of settlement rarely challenged his social authority."

Birth and family
Waldron (or Walderne) was born in Alcester, Warwickshire, England.  One of many children of William Walderne and Catherine Raven, he was christened on 6 January 1615. Little is known of his early life.  The name of his first wife is unknown.  He married second Ann Scammon.  He had several children.

Masonian property dispute
Perhaps because he was a prominent landholder, he was singled out for a lawsuit which was part of a plan seeking to overturn all land titles in colonial New Hampshire in favor of the descendants of John Mason, a colonial governor, colonizer, and admiral who was granted a land patent for the Province of New Hampshire by the British crown and planted the first British colonists there.

Quaker persecution
In 1662, three Quaker missionaries, Ann Coleman, Mary Tompkins and Alice Ambrose, arrived in Dover from England. Within weeks, their ministry became the subject of a public petition by the Puritan townsfolk, 'humbly craving relief against the spreading and the wicked errors of the Quakers among them'. Waldron, as the local crown magistrate, ordered them to be punished as vagabonds by being bound behind a cart and being made to walk over eighty miles in a bitter winter through ten neighboring townships. Beginning in Dover, and on arrival in each township, they were to be publicly stripped to the waist and whipped ten times. Major Robert Pike stopped the torture and released them in Salisbury, the third township in which they were mistreated. There, after urgently required medical assistance from Walter Barefoote, the women left for Maine. These three Quaker women are the subject of the poem How the Women Went from Dover by the 19th-century American Quaker poet, John Greenleaf Whittier.

Trickery against Native Americans
At the end of King Philip's War, a number of Indians fleeing from the Massachusetts Bay Colony militia took refuge with the Abenaki tribe living around Dover. The Massachusetts militia ordered Waldron to attack these natives and turn any refugee combatants over to them.  Waldron believed he could capture the natives without a pitched battle by resorting to subterfuge and so, on 7 September 1676, he invited the natives—about 400 in total, half local and half refugees—to participate in a mock battle against the militia. After the natives had fired their guns, Waldron, aided by Charles Frost, took them prisoner. Waldron then sent both the refugee combatants and those locals who violently objected to this forced breach of hospitality to Boston, where seven or eight leaders were convicted of insurrection and executed, including Monoco, Muttawmp, Matoonas, and Old Jethro (Tantamous) to whom Waldron may have promised amnesty in negotiations with his son Peter Jethro. The rest of the captives were sold into slavery in "foreign parts", mostly Barbados.

The local Indians were released, but never forgave Waldron for the deception, which violated all the rules of honor and hospitality valued by both sides. Richard Waldron was appointed Chief Justice for New Hampshire in 1683.

Cochecho Massacre

During King William's War natives took revenge on Waldron for his actions during King Philip's War in the Cochecho Massacre of 1689. At the time local Pennacook women were regularly allowed into the garrisoned homes of the Dover settlers when they requested shelter for the night. Some settlers were concerned about the lack of vigilance and possible danger from this practice, but Waldron mocked their fears: "go plant your pumpkins" (i.e. I will protect you) Their concern was justified, as on the night of 27 June 1689, native women seemingly staying peacefully overnight opened garrison house doors to waiting armed warriors. One historian wrote, "In one bloody afternoon, a quarter of the colonists in what is now downtown Dover, NH were gone – 23 killed, 29 captured in a revenge attack by native warriors." The elderly Waldron, once disarmed, was singled out for special torture and mutilation: the Indians cut him across the belly with knives, each saying "I cross out my account," and his house burned. Charles Frost was ambushed by natives in 1697 during King William's War for his collaboration with Waldron during the pair's trickery in King Philip's War.

Waldron is buried in the Cochecho Burying Ground, Dover, which is also known as Waldron Cemetery.

Family legacy
His son Richard, grandson Richard, and great grandson Thomas Westbrook Waldron were successively members of the Royal Council for the Province of New Hampshire. The influence of this branch of the Waldron family in New Hampshire declined after the American Revolution, and though Thomas Westbrook Waldron gave his qualified support to the new United States.  This decline came despite the combining of families of influence within the Waldrons: President John Cutt's daughter Hannah married the second Richard Waldron and, after her death, Cutt's grandniece Elinor Vaughan also married the second Richard Waldron.  The third Richard counted two more governors among his family connections; an uncle George Vaughan and Vaughan's brother-in-law Jonathan Belcher.  Richard III in turn married the only daughter of Colonel Thomas Westbrook, leader of the eastern militia and a one-time councillor, grand daughter of a successful Portsmouth sea merchant, Captain John Sherburne, and great-granddaughter of one of the Laconia Company factors and "assistant governor" Ambrose Gibbins. However, "With the disappearance of an old and illustrious family, the release of a third of our central territory to the uses of a new population and the whirl of machinery, old Dover passed away and new Dover began its life."

The family did not entirely disappear after the transfer of the extensive Waldron lands. A Thomas Westbrook Waldron, grandson of Colonel Thomas Westbrook Waldron, moved north to found a Canadian branch of the family in Charlotte County, New Brunswick.  Two other grandsons, Richard Russell Waldron and Thomas Westbrook Waldron (consul) became members of the Wilkes Expedition and lent the family name to a Cape in the Antarctic, a landmark in Hawaii, and an island in the San Juan Islands of present-day Washington state.  Another was an early Major of US Marines, and yet another a college principal.

See also
 List of colonial governors of New Hampshire
 List of speakers of the Massachusetts House of Representatives

References

Works consulted
"Richard Waldron" in: "Brief Notices of Councilors", Collections of the New Hampshire Historical Society, Volume 8 By New Hampshire Historical Society, pp. 332–341 gives a comprehensive biography

Colonial governors of New Hampshire
1615 births
1689 deaths
People from Dover, New Hampshire
People from Warwickshire